This is a list of listed buildings in the parish of Kilmorack in Highland, Scotland. This contains the town of Beauly, as well as an area extending to the west along the north side of the River Beauly, including Struy, Cannich, and Glen Affric.

List 

|}

Key

See also 
 List of listed buildings in Highland

Notes

References
 All entries, addresses and coordinates are based on data from Historic Scotland. This data falls under the Open Government Licence

Kilmorack